The Convento de Santa Marta is a convent in Córdoba, Spain, on Calle de Santa Marta. Founded in 1464, it belongs to the female branch of the order Hieronymites.

Architecturally, the convent was built in the "Reyes Católicos" style and is characterized by its quadrangular nave covered by cross vaults, which highlight the altarpiece, made in the year 1582. The arch gives access to the cloister from the gallery and the Marian images both date to the 15th century. The convent has a late-16th-century altarpiece by the sculptor Andres Ocampo and the painter Baltasar del Águila. The roof of the church is made up of vaults and the entire complex is enclosed within a short wall.

Gallery

References

External links

Buildings and structures in Andalusia
Church architecture
Convents in Spain
Córdoba, Spain
Hieronymites
1464 establishments in Europe
15th-century establishments in Castile